Stolnikov is a Russian masculine surname, its feminine counterpart is Stolnikova. It may refer to
Alexandr Stolnikov (born 1988), Kazakhstani volleyball player
Vladimir Stolnikov (1934–1990), Russian Olympic boxer

Russian-language surnames